Christie Watson (born 1976) is a British writer and retired nurse. Her first novel, Tiny Sunbirds Far Away, won the Costa First Novel Award in the 2011 Costa Book Awards. Her second novel Where Women Are Kings also won critical praise.

Early life and education
Born in Stevenage, she left school at the age of 16 and after volunteering for a year at Scope (then the Spastics Society) went into nursing. She trained at Great Ormond Street Hospital.

Career
Watson worked for approximately 20 years as a nurse, but retired to concentrate on writing after a period of combining the two professions.

Nursing
Her nursing career included Great Ormond Street Hospital, St Mary's Hospital, Paddington, and Guy's and St Thomas' Hospital.

Writing
She won the Malcolm Bradbury Bursary, which enabled her to take an MA in creative writing at the University of East Anglia, from where she graduated in 2009.

Her first novel, Tiny Sunbirds Far Away, won the Costa First Novel Award in the 2011 Costa Book Awards.

Her second novel, Where Women Are Kings (2014), also won critical praise and has been widely translated.

In 2018 she published a memoir, The Language of Kindness: A Nurse's Story, which was broadcast as the "Book of the Week" on BBC Radio 4 in May 2018.<ref name="Guardian 29 April 2018">Molly Case, [https://www.theguardian.com/books/2018/apr/29/language-of-kindness-nurses-story-christie-watson-review "The Language of Kindness: A Nurse's Story by Christie Watson – review"], The Observer, 29 April 2018.</ref> It was named as a Book of the Year in 2018 by The Guardian, Sunday Times, The Daily Telegraph, The Times, New Statesman, Netgalley and Reading Agency.

Private life
Watson lives in London with her two children. She met her paediatrician partner when they were both working at St Mary's Hospital in west London.

Bibliography
 Tiny Sunbirds Far Away, Quercus, 2011. 
 Where Women are Kings, Quercus, 2014. 
 Here I Stand, Walker Books, 2016. 
 The Language of Kindness: A Nurse's Story, 3 May 2018. 
 “The Courage to Care : nurses, families and hope”, 2020

References

External links
 Official website
 "Christie Watson's novel out of Africa", Evening Standard, 29 November 2011.
 "Christie Watson, the Costa-nominated writer who can't give up nursing", The Telegraph, 20 November 2011.
"The Language of Kindness: A Nurse's Story", BBC Radio 4, Book of the Week'', May 2018,

1976 births
Living people
Alumni of the University of East Anglia
Costa Book Award winners
British writers
People from Stevenage
Date of birth missing (living people)